Veldvoetbal Voetbalvereniging Hoogeveen is a football club from Hoogeveen, Netherlands. It plays in the 2017-2018 Hoofdklasse of the Royal Dutch Football Association. The club was founded on April 29, 1930 and has about 650 members. It plays home matches at Bentickspark. It host football for seniors, junior teams, futsal and women.

History 
After the founding of the Hoofdklasse in 1973 VV Hoogeveen soon joined. In 1975 the club promoted to what was then the highest amateur league. The biggest success of the club came in 1978, when the team became champion of the ‘Hoofdklasse B’ and ‘Dutch amateur champion’ of the Sunday ‘Hoofdklasse’. In subsequent years VV Hoogeveen managed to play many additional seasons in the ‘Hoofdklasse’. Especially the late 1980s were rather successful. To date VV Hoogeveen has played eighteen years of ‘Hoofdklasse’.

In 2017, the male first squad was joined by goalkeeper Nick Borgman.

In the 2021–22 season, Hoogeveen qualified for the promotion playoffs, but lost 5-2 on aggregate to VV Hoogland in the first round.

Overview 
 1931: Promotion to 1e Klasse Noordelijke VB
 1935: Promotion to 3e Klasse KNVB
 1939: Relegation to 4e Klasse KNVB
 1943: Relegation to de Drentse Voetbalbond
 1949: Promotion to 4e Klasse KNVB
 1951: Promotion to 3e Klasse KNVB
 1954: Relegation to 4e Klasse KNVB
 1960: Promotion to 3e Klasse KNVB
 1966: Promotion to 2e Klasse KNVB
 1973: Promotion to 1e Klasse KNVB
 1974: Promotion to Hoofdklasse
 1978: Champions Hoofdklasse B
 1978: Dutch Champions Sunday Amateurs
 1982: Relegation 1e Klasse KNVB
 1984: Promotion Hoofdklasse
 1991: Relegation 1e Klasse KNVB
 1994: Relegation 2e Klasse KNVB
 1996: Promotion 1e Klasse KNVB
 1997: Promotion Hoofdklasse
 1998: Relegation 1e Klasse KNVB

 1999: Relegation 2e Klasse KNVB
 2000: Promotion 1e Klasse KNVB
 2001: Promotion Hoofdklasse
 2005: Relegation 1e Klasse KNVB
 2010: Promotion Hoofdklasse

Honours 
 1978: Champions Hoofdklasse B (Sunday)
 1978: Dutch Champions Sunday Amateurs
 1980: Noordelijke Districtsbeker (Northern amateur Cup)
 2008: Noordelijke Districtsbeker (Northern amateur Cup)

Accommodation

Stadium 
VV Hoogeveen plays in a small stadium close to the town centre. The stadium has a capacity of about 6,000 spectators, of which 500 can sit and another 500 can stand underneath roofs. The accommodation encompasses two other fields and two youth pitches where other teams can play their matches.

Attendance 
 
Seizoen 2002–2003: 528 (hoofdklasse)
Seizoen 2003–2004: 554 (hoofdklasse)
Seizoen 2004–2005: 458 (hoofdklasse)
Seizoen 2005–2006: 475 (1e klasse)
Seizoen 2006–2007: 400 (1e klasse)
Seizoen 2007–2008: 535 (1e klasse)
Seizoen 2008–2009: 480 (1e klasse)
Seizoen 2009–2010: 455 (1e klasse)
Seizoen 2010–2011: 473 (Hoofdklasse)
Seizoen 2011–2012: 380 (Hoofdklasse)
Seizoen 2012–2013: 355 (Hoofdklasse)

Support

Businessclub 
The Businessclub Hoogeveen was founded in 1993 to provide additional support to the football club, both at a recreational and competitive level. Also, it provides the opportunity for local and regional business to meet and liaise. It has over 130 members and is one of the biggest and most active business clubs in the north of the Netherlands.

Fans 
The fans have united themselves in the 'Supportersvereniging VV Hoogeveen', founded in 1949. Next to its support for VV Hoogeveen, it hosts a number of activities for its fans and helps in the organisation of events.

The club 
As of the season 2013/2014, the vv Hoogeveen has the following teams:
 Senior Men: 8
 Junior: 21

References

External links 

Businessclub Hoogeveen website

Football clubs in the Netherlands
Association football clubs established in 1930
1930 establishments in the Netherlands
Football clubs in Hoogeveen